Marco Bocci (pseudonym of Marco Bocciolini; born 4 August 1977) is an Italian actor. He appeared in more than twenty films since 2001. 

He married fellow actress Laura Chiatti in 2014. They have two sons.

Filmography
 Interference (1998)
 I cavalieri che fecero l'impresa (2001)
 Los Borgia (2006)
 La bella società (2009)
 C'è chi dice no (2011)
 Scusate se esisto! (2014)
 Io rom romantica (2014)
 Italo (2015)
 L'esigenza di unirmi ogni volta con te (2015)
 Watch Them Fall (2015)
 La banda dei tre (2017)
De sable et de feu (2019)

References

External links 

1977 births
Living people
People from Marsciano
Italian male film actors
Italian male television actors